The name Heffernan is derived from the Irish name Ó hIfearnáin, which comes from the given name Ifearnan meaning "demon". Heffernan gives rise to alternatives such as Heffernon and Hefferan. The name sometimes contains the O' prefix.

List of people surnamed Heffernan
Angie Heffernan, Fijian activist
Bill Heffernan (born 1943), Australian senator
Bob Heffernan, Australian footballer
Chris Heffernan, Australian footballer
Christian Heffernan, Canadian footballer
Christy Heffernan, Irish sportsman
Daniel Heffernan, English footballer
Dean Heffernan, Australian soccer player
Frank Heffernan (1892–1938), Canadian hockey player
Gavin Heffernan, Canadian filmmaker
Gerald Heffernan, Canadian ice hockey player
James Heffernan (Irish politician), Irish politician
James J. Heffernan (1888–1967), U.S. Representative from New York
John Heffernan (disambiguation), several people
Josephine Heffernan (1876 - 1962), Irish-American nurse
Kate Heffernan (born 1999), New Zealand cricketer
Kevin Heffernan (disambiguation), several people
Killian Heffernan (born 2002), Irish darts player
Margaret Heffernan, international businesswoman and writer
Michael Heffernan (disambiguation), several people
Nathan Heffernan (1920–2007), American judge
Neil Heffernan (1970–present), American professor of computer science
Paul Heffernan, Irish footballer
Ray Heffernan (disambiguation), several people
Robert Heffernan, Irish walker
Roy Heffernan (1926–1993), Australian wrestler
Seamie Heffernan, Irish jockey
Virginia Heffernan, American journalist
William Heffernan, American author
William J. Heffernan (1872–1955), New York politician

Fictional characters
Carrie Heffernan, fictional character in The King of Queens
Doug Heffernan, fictional character in The King of Queens

Other uses
 Heffernan v. City of Paterson, a legal case

Sources
 Heffernan at behindthename.com

Surnames of Irish origin